George Blundell Longstaff (2 February 1849 – 7 May 1921) was a British civil activist who worked for the London Borough of Wandsworth, amateur entomologist and writer. 

George was the second son of George Dixon Longstaff, a physician in Wandsworth, and Maria Blundell. He was educated at Rugby and New College, Oxford and after obtaining a degree in 1871 in  natural science he studied medicine at St. Thomas's Hospital, obtaining a Mead Medal, and graduated B.M. in 1876 but he never practiced medicine. He worked for fourteen years as the representative for Wandsworth in the London County Council. An interest in entomology was sparked at an early age, influenced by his uncle William Spence. An injury to his eye while studying at Oxford however put an end to his entomological studies but he took a keen interest on a trip through India and Sri Lanka in 1903-4 accompanied by his second wife, the geologist Mary Jane Longstaff. He collected some 14000 specimens which were donated to the Hope collection at Oxford and he wrote a book Butterfly Hunting in Many Lands (1912). He also took an interest in demographic statistics and published Studies in statistics, social, political, and medical (1891).

References

External links 
 Butterfly-hunting in many lands (1912)
Rural Depopulation (1893)

English entomologists